The Canby Herald is a weekly paper published in Canby, Oregon, United States, since 1906, and covering the cities of Canby and Aurora. As of 2014, the paper is published on Wednesdays and has a circulation of 5,410. The paper was previously (as of 2012) published bi-weekly, on Wednesdays and Saturdays, but sharing content with the Woodburn Independent in its Saturday edition.  In January 2013, the paper was sold to the Pamplin Media Group along with five other papers owned by Eagle Newspapers.

It is one of the state's oldest newspapers.

References

External links
Canby Herald (official website)

1906 establishments in Oregon
Canby, Oregon
Newspapers published by Pamplin Media Group
Oregon Newspaper Publishers Association
Publications established in 1906